Jorayal is a Gaupalika in Doti District in the Sudurpashchim Province of far-western Nepal. 
Jorayal has a population of 20824.The land area is 419.09 km2.

Demographics
At the time of the 2011 Nepal census, Jorayal Rural Municipality had a population of 21,296. Of these, 72.7% spoke Doteli, 19.7% Nepali, 4.7% Magar, 1.7% Kham, 0.5% Sherpa, 0.3% Achhami, 0.1% Gurung and 0.3% others.

In terms of ethnicity/caste, 57.3% were Chhetri, 12.7% Magar, 10.2% Kami, 8.4% Hill Brahmin, 4.1% Sarki, 2.3% Thakuri, 1.4% Damai/Dholi, 0.9% Badi, 0.5% Newar, 0.4% Bhote, 0.3% other Dalit, 0.3% Sanyasi/Dasnami, 0.2% Rai, 0.2% Tamang, 0.2% Gurung, 0.1% Lohar, 0.1% other Terai, 0.1% Dura, 0.1% Limbu and 0.2% others.

In terms of religion, 96.7% were Hindu, 2.8% Buddhist, 0.4% Christian and 0.1% Prakriti.

References

Rural municipalities in Doti District
Rural municipalities of Nepal established in 2017